Ellen Lee DeGeneres (born January 26, 1958) often referred to mononymously as Ellen, is an American comedian, television host, actress, writer, and producer. She starred in the sitcom Ellen from 1994 to 1998, which earned her a Primetime Emmy Award for "The Puppy Episode". She also hosted the syndicated television talk show, The Ellen DeGeneres Show from 2003 to 2022, for which she received 33 Daytime Emmy Awards.

Her stand-up career started in the early 1980s and included a 1986 appearance on The Tonight Show Starring Johnny Carson. As a film actress, DeGeneres starred in Mr. Wrong (1996), EDtv (1999), and The Love Letter (1999), and provided the voice of Dory in the Disney/Pixar animated films Finding Nemo (2003) and Finding Dory (2016); for Finding Nemo, she was awarded the Saturn Award for Best Supporting Actress, the first time an actress won a Saturn Award for a voice performance. In 2010, she served as a judge on the ninth season of American Idol.

She starred in two television sitcoms, Ellen from 1994 to 1998 and The Ellen Show from 2001 to 2002. During the fourth season of Ellen in 1997, she came out as a lesbian in an appearance on The Oprah Winfrey Show. Her character, Ellen Morgan, also came out to a therapist played by Winfrey, and the series went on to explore various LGBT issues, including the coming-out process. In 2008, she married her longtime girlfriend Portia de Rossi.

DeGeneres has hosted the Academy Awards, Grammy Awards, and the Primetime Emmys. She has authored four books and started her own record company, Eleveneleven, as well as a production company, A Very Good Production. She also launched a lifestyle brand, ED Ellen DeGeneres, which comprises a collection of apparel, accessories, home, baby, and pet items. She has won the Mark Twain Prize for American Humor, 20 People's Choice Awards (more than any other person), and numerous other awards for her work and charitable efforts. In 2016, she received the Presidential Medal of Freedom. In January 2020, DeGeneres received the Carol Burnett Award at the Golden Globes for her work on television, becoming the first recipient after its inaugural namesake Carol Burnett.

Early life and education
DeGeneres was born and raised in Metairie, Louisiana, to Elizabeth Jane "Betty" (née Pfeffer), born 1930), a speech therapist, and Elliott Everett DeGeneres (1925–2018), an insurance agent. She has one brother, Vance, a musician and producer. Of French, English, German, and Irish descent, she was raised a Christian Scientist. Her parents filed for separation in 1973 and were divorced the following year. Shortly after, her mother married Roy Gruessendorf, a salesman. Betty Jane and Ellen moved with Gruessendorf from the New Orleans area to Atlanta, Texas. Vance stayed with his father.

When she was 15 or 16 years old, DeGeneres was molested by her stepfather. Gruessendorf used her mother's recent breast cancer diagnosis as an excuse to touch her inappropriately, saying he needed to examine her breasts for lumps. Eventually, he tried to break down her door and sexually assault her, prompting her to run away from home and spend the night in a hospital. DeGeneres told her mother about the abuse a few years later, but Betty Jane did not believe her, and remained married to Gruessendorf for 18 years afterward. She finally realized that DeGeneres had been telling the truth when his accounts of his behavior toward his stepdaughter kept changing. Gruessendorf died in 1997.

DeGeneres graduated from Atlanta High School in May 1976, after completing her first years of high school at Grace King High School in Metairie. She moved back to New Orleans to attend the University of New Orleans, where she majored in communication studies. After one semester, she left school to do clerical work in a law firm with a cousin, Laura Gillen. Her early jobs included a stint at J. C. Penney and waitressing at TGI Fridays and another restaurant. She also worked as a house painter, a hostess and a bartender. She relates much of her childhood and career experiences in her comedic work.

Stand-up comedy
DeGeneres started performing stand-up comedy at small clubs and coffee houses. By 1981, she was the emcee at Clyde's Comedy Club in New Orleans. DeGeneres cites Woody Allen and Steve Martin as her main influences at this time. In the early 1980s she began to tour nationally, and in 1984 she was named Showtime's funniest person in America.

After a 15-year hiatus from performing stand-up comedy, DeGeneres appeared in a 2018 Netflix stand-up special, Relatable.

DeGeneres lists Lucille Ball, Carol Burnett and Bob Newhart among her comedic influences.

Film career
Ellen's work in the late 1980s and early 1990s included the film Coneheads. DeGeneres starred in a series of films for a show named Ellen's Energy Adventure, which was part of the Universe of Energy attraction and pavilion at Walt Disney World's Epcot. The film also featured Bill Nye, Alex Trebek, Michael Richards, and Jamie Lee Curtis. The show revolved around DeGeneres's falling asleep and finding herself in an energy-themed version of Jeopardy!, playing against an old rival, portrayed by Curtis, and Albert Einstein. The next film had DeGeneres co-hosting an educational look at energy with Nye. The ride first opened on September 15, 1996, as Ellen's Energy Crisis, but was quickly given the more positive-sounding name Ellen's Energy Adventure. The ride closed permanently on August 13, 2017.

Television career

1989–2002

DeGeneres's first regular TV role was in a short-lived Fox sitcom called Open House. She played the role of Margo Van Meter, an office worker at the Juan Verde Real Estate company. The show co-starred Alison LaPlaca and Mary Page Keller. In 1992, producers Neal Marlens and Carol Black cast DeGeneres in their sitcom Laurie Hill, in the role of Nurse Nancy MacIntyre. The series was canceled after only four episodes, but Marlens and Black were so impressed with DeGeneres's performance that they soon cast her in their next ABC pilot, These Friends of Mine, which they co-created with David S. Rosenthal.

DeGeneres's comedy career became the basis of the sitcom Ellen, named These Friends of Mine during its first season. The ABC show was popular in its first few seasons due in part to DeGeneres's style of observational humor; it was often referred to as a "female Seinfeld".

Ellen reached its height of popularity in April 1997, when DeGeneres came out as a lesbian on The Oprah Winfrey Show. Her character on the sitcom also came out of the closet to her therapist, played by Oprah Winfrey. The coming-out episode, titled "The Puppy Episode", was one of the highest-rated episodes of the show. The series returned for a fifth season but experienced falling ratings and was cancelled.

DeGeneres returned to television in 2001 with a new CBS sitcom, The Ellen Show, which was cancelled after 13 episodes. In 2007, a former writer said she treated the writers "like shit" saying "Why do you keep writing these unfunny jokes?" After her sitcoms, DeGeneres would later re-establish herself as a successful talk show host.

2003–2017 

DeGeneres launched a daytime television talk show, The Ellen DeGeneres Show, in September 2003. One of several celebrity-hosted talk shows surfacing at the beginning of that season, including those of Sharon Osbourne and Rita Rudner, her show has consistently risen in the Nielsen ratings and received widespread critical praise. It was nominated for 11 Daytime Emmy Awards in its first season, winning four, including Best Talk Show. The show won 25 Emmy Awards for its first three seasons on the air. DeGeneres is known for her dancing and singing with the audience at the beginning of the show and during commercial breaks. She often gives away free prizes and trips to be in her show's studio audience with the help of her sponsors.

DeGeneres celebrated her thirty-year class reunion by flying her graduating class to California to be guests on her show in February 2006. She presented Atlanta High School with a surprise gift of a new electronic LED marquee sign. DeGeneres made a surprise appearance at Tulane University's May 2006 commencement in New Orleans. Following George H. W. Bush and Bill Clinton to the podium, she appeared in a bathrobe and furry slippers. "They told me everyone would be wearing robes," she said. Ellen made another commencement speech at Tulane in 2009.

The show broadcast for a week from Universal Studios Orlando in March 2007. Skits included DeGeneres going on the Hulk Roller Coaster Ride and the Jaws Boat Ride. DeGeneres was placed on bed rest in May 2007 due to a torn ligament in her back. She continued hosting her show from a hospital bed, tended to by a nurse, explaining "the show must go on, as they say." Guests sat in hospital beds as well. On May 1, 2009, DeGeneres celebrated her 1000th episode with celebrity guests such as Oprah Winfrey, Justin Timberlake and Paris Hilton, among others. Jennifer Aniston and Justin Timberlake surprised DeGeneres on her 2,000th show in December 2015.

DeGeneres replaced Paula Abdul as a judge on the ninth season of American Idol. Her role started after the contestant auditions, at the beginning of "Hollywood Week". It is reported that DeGeneres also signed a contract to be a judge on the show for at least five seasons. She made her American Idol debut on February 9, 2010. However, on July 29, 2010, DeGeneres and Fox executives announced that the comedian would be leaving American Idol after one season. In a statement, DeGeneres said that the series "didn't feel like the right fit for me".

DeGeneres began hosting the NBC game show Ellen's Game of Games during the 2017–2018 television season. Based on games played on her talk show, the series previewed on December 18, 2017, with regular episodes starting the following January. It would run for four total seasons until May 2021, with its cancellation announced in January 2022.

2018–present 
The New York Times profiled DeGeneres in 2018 as she faced the decision of renewing her talk-show contract and was exploring other outlets for her creativity, including her Netflix comedy special Relatable, which spoofs her kind image. They noted she felt boxed in with a reputation of always being nice, and the host who danced all the time. DeGeneres—who acknowledges that she has always been overly sensitive—fretted how her audience would react when she no longer wanted to dance. Her Christian Scientist upbringing included her father's psyche, "He was a very fearful man, he couldn't hear or engage with anything unpleasant."

On May 12, 2021, DeGeneres announced that she would end her talk show following the conclusion of its nineteenth season in 2022. The show aired its final episode on May 26, 2022, with Jennifer Aniston, Pink and Billie Eilish appearing as guests, while Portia de Rossi and other members of DeGeneres' family sat in the audience.

Award shows
DeGeneres received wider exposure on November 4, 2001, when she hosted the televised broadcast of the Emmy Awards. Presented after two cancellations due to network concerns that a lavish ceremony following the September 11 attacks would appear insensitive, the show required a more somber tone that would also allow viewers to temporarily forget the tragedy. DeGeneres received several standing ovations for her performance that evening, which included the line: "What would bug the Taliban more than seeing a gay woman in a suit surrounded by Jews?"

In August 2005, DeGeneres hosted the 2005 Primetime Emmy Awards ceremony held on September 18, 2005. This was three weeks after Hurricane Katrina, making it the second time she hosted the Emmys following a national tragedy. She also hosted the Grammy Awards in 1996 and in 1997.

On September 7, 2006, DeGeneres was selected to host the 79th Academy Awards ceremony, which took place on February 25, 2007. This makes her the first openly gay person to have hosted the event. During the Awards show, DeGeneres said, "What a wonderful night, such diversity in the room, in a year when there's been so many negative things said about people's race, religion, and sexual orientation. And I want to put this out there: If there weren't blacks, Jews and gays, there would be no Oscars, or anyone named Oscar, when you think about that." Reviews of her hosting gig were positive, with one saying, "DeGeneres rocked, as she never forgot that she wasn't just there to entertain the Oscar nominees but also to tickle the audience at home." Regis Philbin said in an interview that "the only complaint was there's not enough Ellen."

DeGeneres was nominated for an Emmy Award as host of the Academy Awards broadcast. On August 2, 2013, it was announced that DeGeneres would host the Academy Awards on March 2, 2014, for the second time.

A selfie orchestrated by 86th Academy Awards host Ellen DeGeneres during the broadcast is the fifth-most retweeted tweet ever. DeGeneres said she wanted to homage Meryl Streep's record 17 Oscar nominations by setting a new record with her, and invited other Oscar celebrities to join them. The resulting photo of twelve celebrities broke the previous retweet record within forty minutes and was retweeted over 1.8 million times in the first hour. By the end of the ceremony it had been retweeted over 2 million times, less than 24 hours later, it had been retweeted over 2.8 million times. , it has been retweeted over 3.4 million times. The group selfie effort was parodied by Lego and Matt Groening with The Simpsons. It beat the previous record, which was held by Barack Obama, following his victory in the 2012 presidential election.

Other ventures

ED Ellen DeGeneres 
DeGeneres launched her lifestyle brand under the name ED by Ellen in the summer of 2015. After her initial collections, the brand name then changed to ED Ellen DeGeneres to incorporate the licensed arm of her brand. The collection includes apparel, shoes, accessories, pet, baby and home items. DeGeneres's dog collection at PetSmart was launched in February 2017, and a cat line was introduced later that year.

In November 2017, the brand launched a collection to benefit DeGeneres' #BeKindToElephants campaign featuring a tee and baby one piece, donating 100% of the proceeds to the David Sheldrick Wildlife Trust. Then, DeGeneres created a line with her brand to benefit the newly created Ellen DeGeneres Wildlife Fund, a member of the Digit Fund, to launch a line of tees and footwear to help gorillas.

Voice acting
DeGeneres lent her voice to the role of Dory, a friendly fish with short-term memory loss, in the 2003 animated Disney/Pixar film Finding Nemo. The film's director, Andrew Stanton, said that he chose Ellen because she changed the subject five times before one sentence had finished on her show. For her performance as Dory, DeGeneres won the Saturn Award from the Academy of Science Fiction, Fantasy & Horror Films for Best Supporting Actress; Favorite Voice from an Animated Movie from the Nickelodeon Kids' Choice Awards; and the Annie Award from the International Animated Film Association, for Outstanding Voice Acting. She was also nominated for a Chicago Film Critics Association Award in the Best Supporting Actress category. She also provided the voice of the dog in the prologue of the Eddie Murphy feature film Dr. Dolittle. Her win of the Saturn Award marked the first and only time the Academy of Science Fiction, Fantasy & Horror Films has given the acting award for a voice performance.

She reprised the role of Dory from Finding Nemo in the 2016 sequel, Finding Dory.

Commercial spokesperson
In November 2004, DeGeneres appeared, dancing, in an ad campaign for American Express. Her most recent American Express commercial, a two-minute black-and-white spot in which she works with animals, debuted in November 2006 and was created by Ogilvy & Mather. In 2007, the commercial won the Emmy Award for Outstanding Commercial.

DeGeneres began working with CoverGirl Cosmetics in September 2008, for which she has been criticized, as her animal-friendly values clash with Procter and Gamble's (the maker of CoverGirl Cosmetics) animal testing. Her face became the focus of CoverGirl advertisements starting in January 2009. The beauty campaign was DeGeneres's first.<ref>[http://www.covergirl.com/ellen/ Easy, breezy, beautiful Ellen: It's Official! Ellen DeGeneres is now a Cover Girl!]  Cover Girl web site. Retrieved September 16, 2008.</ref>

On December 3, 2011, DeGeneres headlined the third annual "Change Begins Within" gala for the David Lynch Foundation held at the Los Angeles County Museum of Art.

In spring 2012, DeGeneres became the spokesperson for J. C. Penney in a tour and advertising campaign.

DeGeneres represents a line of products on QVC, a home shopping network. Her line of home products, initialized as E.D., for Ellen DeGeneres, began being offered on QVC on October 24, 2014, under the name E.D. on Air.

On September 4, 2018, TCL, announced its extension as the Official TV of The Ellen DeGeneres Show for a fifth consecutive season.

On August 15, 2018, it was announced that DeGeneres would partner with Walmart to launch a fashion collection under the brand name EV1, a low-cost alternative to her ED Ellen DeGeneres product. The collection officially launched on September 10, 2018, with price points under $30.

eleveneleven

On May 26, 2010, DeGeneres announced on her show that she was starting her own record label entitled "eleveneleven". She explained her choice of name, claiming that she often sees the number 11:11 when looking at her clocks, that she found singer Greyson Chance on the 11th, and that the singer's soccer jersey has the number 11. She mentioned that she had been looking for videos of performances on YouTube to start her label. The first act she signed to the label was Chance.

Personal life
Wealth and popularityForbes estimated DeGeneres's 2020 earnings at US$84 million and her net worth at US$370 million, making her the 12th-highest-paid entertainer in the world. In 2015, she was named the 50th-most powerful woman in the world by Forbes and came second on the World Pride Power list. As of August 2, 2018, she has more than 76 million followers on Twitter and 55.8 million followers on Instagram, making her the tenth-most followed user on Twitter and the 29th-most followed user on Instagram.

DeGeneres is a fan of the NFL but does not follow one team; she has shown support for the New Orleans Saints and the Green Bay Packers, and attended a 2011 Saints practice session dressed as Packers Hall of Famer Don Hutson.

Sexual orientation and relationships

In 1997, DeGeneres came out as a lesbian. The disclosure of her sexual orientation sparked intense interest by American tabloids. The contentiousness of the media coverage stunted her professional career and left her "mired in depression". In her book Love, Ellen, DeGeneres's mother Betty describes being initially shocked when DeGeneres came out, but she has since become one of her strongest supporters; she is also an active member of PFLAG and spokesperson for the Human Rights Campaign's Coming Out Project. The same year she came out, DeGeneres started a romantic relationship with actress Anne Heche that lasted until August 2000. From 2000 to 2004, DeGeneres maintained a close relationship with photographer Alexandra Hedison. The couple appeared on the cover of The Advocate after their separation had already been announced to the media.

Since 2004, DeGeneres has had a relationship with Portia de Rossi. After the overturn of the same-sex marriage ban in California, DeGeneres and de Rossi were engaged, and married in August 2008, at their home in Beverly Hills, California, where they live with their four dogs and three cats.Singh, Anita (August 18, 2008). "Television presenter Ellen DeGeneres marries lesbian lover Portia de Ross" . The Daily Telegraph. The passage of Proposition 8 cast doubt on the legal status of their marriage, but a subsequent California Supreme Court judgment validated it because it occurred before November 4, 2008. On August 6, 2010, de Rossi filed a petition to legally change her name to Portia Lee James DeGeneres. The petition was granted on September 23, 2010.

Animal rights and veganism
DeGeneres previously described herself as a vegan and "big animal lover". De Rossi is also a vegan. DeGeneres co-ordinated a vegan outreach website titled "Going Vegan with Ellen". She intended to open a vegan tapas bar, Bokado, in Los Angeles, but plans fell through. The website for The Ellen DeGeneres Show formerly contained a section called "Going Vegan with Ellen", in which she promoted "Meatless Mondays" and featured vegan recipes. In 2016, DeGeneres stated that she had re-introduced fish into her diet, and confirmed that she had stopped following a vegan lifestyle "in the last year or two for no reason really" in her 2018 stand-up comedy special Relatable.

DeGeneres has invited Humane Society of the United States CEO Wayne Pacelle to speak on her show several times about the organization's efforts in animal protection legislation. In 2009, PETA named her their "Woman of the Year". In April 2013, she donated $25,000 to stop Ag-Gag anti-whistleblower legislation in Tennessee, which would prohibit undercover investigators from recording footage of animal abuse on farms. In 2010, DeGeneres served as campaign ambassador to Farm Sanctuary's Adopt-A-Turkey Project, asking people to start "a new tradition by adopting a turkey instead of eating one" at Thanksgiving.

Humanitarianism
In November 2011, Secretary of State Hillary Clinton named DeGeneres a special envoy for Global AIDS Awareness. On December 3, 2011, DeGeneres opened the show at the David Lynch Foundation's 3rd annual "Change Begins Within" gala at the Los Angeles County Museum of Art to raise funds to bring Transcendental Meditation to at-risk populations suffering from epidemic levels of chronic stress and stress-related disorders. She says: "TM is the only time I have that stillness… it gives me this peaceful feeling, and I love it so much. I can't say enough good things about it. All the benefits that you can achieve from sitting still and going within—it really is a beautiful experience. David Lynch is such a wonderful man to start this foundation to help people."

In November 2017, it was announced that President Donald Trump would begin allowing the importation of elephant trophies from Africa. In response, DeGeneres created a hashtag campaign in partnership with her brand, ED Ellen DeGeneres, to donate to the David Sheldrick Wildlife Trust. She also created a T-shirt with her brand whose proceeds also go to the organization.

In January 2018, for DeGeneres's 60th birthday, de Rossi gifted her a permanent gorilla home in Rwanda built in her name for the Digit Fund. This gift was part of a new arm of the Digit Fund now called the "Ellen DeGeneres Wildlife Fund".

Friendship with George W. Bush
In October 2019, DeGeneres attended an NFL game between the Green Bay Packers and Dallas Cowboys at the invitation of Cowboys owner Jerry Jones. While at the game, she was seated next to former president George W. Bush. Her friendly interactions with Bush, captured by stadium cameras, attracted criticism due to his past opposition to same-sex marriage, his administration and his responsibility for the Iraq War and its associated torture and civilian deaths. Actor Mark Ruffalo was among those who criticized DeGeneres for her friendship with Bush.

In response to the criticism, DeGeneres explained her friendship with Bush in a monologue on her show. During the segment, she maintained that she believes personal relationships should transcend political differences and compared her friendship with Bush to her friendships with people who wear fur, a practice she does not condone. Former first lady Michelle Obama was among those who defended DeGeneres.

Allegations of on-set bullying
In July 2020, 10 former employees of The Ellen DeGeneres Show accused DeGeneres of creating a "toxic" on-set atmosphere of "racism, fear, and intimidation", including failing to address executives sexually harassing female employees and making "racist micro-aggressions and abuse" to or about employees of color, firing employees for taking medical and bereavement leave, and replacing her own crew with non-union workers during the early days of the COVID-19 pandemic. The allegations, which the employees made anonymously to Buzzfeed News, followed previous reports of hostile and bullying behavior, such as a former employee's allegation that DeGeneres fired him for setting up a GoFundMe page to cover medical costs not covered by their workplace health insurance.

Months earlier, comedian and podcaster Kevin T. Porter published a thread on Twitter in which he called DeGeneres "notoriously one of the meanest people alive", and asked other Twitter users to post "stories you've heard about Ellen being mean", pledging to donate two dollars to the Los Angeles Food Bank for each post. The thread quickly went viral, with several posts from people who had interacted directly with DeGeneres or had friends and family who had, accusing her of behavior such as complaining to a waitress' employer about her chipped fingernails and having an autistic janitor fired for talking directly to her.

In July 2020, Telepictures, a unit of Warner Bros. Entertainment, released an interoffice memo that they would launch an internal investigation, employing WarnerMedia’s employee relations team and a third-party consultant to conduct confidential interviews with current and former employees about their experiences on The Ellen DeGeneres Show''. DeGeneres herself, meanwhile, issued a statement to her staff taking responsibility for the workplace culture on the show and pledging to "correct the issues" going forward. WarnerMedia began an investigation. DeGeneres apologized to her staff, releasing a statement reading, "On day one of our show, I told everyone in our first meeting that 'The Ellen DeGeneres Show' would be a place of happiness—no one would ever raise their voice, and everyone would be treated with respect. Obviously, something changed, and I am disappointed to learn that this has not been the case. And for that, I am sorry. Anyone who knows me knows it's the opposite of what I believe and what I hoped for our show."

Following the investigation, three executives left, and the show vowed to take steps to change the culture. DeGeneres apologized again during the eighteenth season's September 2020 opening.

Filmography

Film

Television

As executive producer

Video games

Music videos

Discography

Albums

Audiobooks

Podcasts

Awards and honors

Bibliography

References

External links

 
 The Ellen DeGeneres Show
 

 
1958 births
20th-century American actresses
20th-century American comedians
20th-century American women writers
20th-century American LGBT people
21st-century American actresses
21st-century American comedians
21st-century American women writers
21st-century American LGBT people
Activists from California
Actresses from Beverly Hills, California
Actresses from New Orleans
American film actresses
American game show hosts
American Idol participants
American people of English descent
American people of French descent
American people of German descent
American people of Irish descent
American stand-up comedians
American television actresses
American television talk show hosts
American voice actresses
American women comedians
American women philanthropists
American women television presenters
Annie Award winners
Cajun people
Carol Burnett Award Golden Globe winners
Comedians from Louisiana
Daytime Emmy Award for Outstanding Talk Show Host winners
Former Christian Scientists
American lesbian actresses
American lesbian writers
American LGBT broadcasters
Lesbian comedians
LGBT people from California
LGBT people from Louisiana
American LGBT rights activists
Living people
Mark Twain Prize recipients
People from Atlanta, Texas
People from Metairie, Louisiana
Presidential Medal of Freedom recipients
Primetime Emmy Award winners
QVC people
Surreal comedy
University of New Orleans alumni
Writers from California
Writers from New Orleans
American LGBT comedians